Accolon  is a character in Arthurian legends where he is a lover of Morgan le Fay who is killed by King Arthur in a duel during the plot involving the sword Excalibur. He appears in Arthurian prose romances since the Post-Vulgate Cycle, including as Accalon in the French original Huth Merlin and Acalón in the Spanish adaptation El Baladro del Sabe Merlin.

Medieval literature
In Thomas Malory's Le Morte d'Arthur, Accolon is referred to as Sir Accolon of Gaul. He is the object of desire for Morgan le Fay, King Arthur's half-sister. (As described in Accolon's original story in the Post-Vulgate Suite de Merlin that was Malory's source: "She loved him so madly that she desired to kill her husband [King Urien] and her brother [King Arthur], for she thought she could make Accolon king, either by the devil's help or by magic or by entreaty of the nobles of Great Britain.")

At an early stage in Malory's book, Accolon is hunting together with King Arthur and King Urien when they become lost and are forced to camp in the woods. After they came upon and board Morgan's fairy boat, Accolon awakens in a field where Morgan appears and gives him the magic sword Excalibur, which Arthur had earlier entrusted to her. She tells him he must use the weapon in his next fight with a mysterious swordsman who is actually Arthur, himself wielding a sword he believes to be Excalibur but which was actually a fake given to him by Morgan. Neither man recognises the other but Accolon gains the upper hand due to wielding the real Excalibur, as well as its also magical scabbard, together giving its user the near invincibility in battle. During the duel, Arthur's sword breaks; he quickly realises this was not the real Excalibur and that he has been betrayed. Rather than giving up, Arthur continues to fight with what was left of his shield. Nimue, the Lady of the Lake (Nineve in the Post-Vulgate), arrives in the last minute and uses her magic to cause Excalibur to fly from Accolon's hand. Arthur then wrestles the scabbard back and deals Accolon a mortal wound. At the same time, Morgan tries to personally murder the sleeping Urien, her husband, but is stopped by their own son Yvain. When Arthur finally recognises Accolon and learns of Morgan's part in the plot, he assures his friend that he would not be punished if he lives, however Accolon dies from his wound four days later.

Accolon's body is sent by Arthur to Morgan, at the time still at Camelot, who grieves after him greatly. She takes revenge on Arthur by stealing Excalibur's protective scabbard (arguably more valuable than the sword itself) and then losing it to the world forever by throwing it into an enchanted lake. Later, Morgan also comes upon Arthur's knight named Manassen (Manessen) who is in deadly peril (about to be drowned in a well by another knight who claims Manassen is guilty of adultery with his wife). When Morgan learns Manassen was Accolon's cousin, she saves him and even enables him to drown his enemy, which he gladly does.

Modern Arthuriana
Accolon also appears in some of modern Arthurian fiction. For instance, the scene of his battle with Arthur is included in Marion Zimmer Bradley's The Mists of Avalon, though with the role of Nimue omitted. In Bradley's interpretation, Morgan and Accolon's aim was to restore the pre-Roman Celtic pagan religion, threatened by the aggressive advent of Christianity; Accolon is the second son of Uriens and a knight loyal to Avalon. He becomes Morgan's lover, and she wants him to kill King Arthur and so restore the power of Avalon, but Arthur slays him in direct combat; when Morgan's role becomes evident, she is disgraced. The novel's Accolon was portrayed by Ian Duncan in its television adaptation. Another version of Accolon was portrayed by Anthony Dutton in the television series The Legend of King Arthur.

References

Arthurian characters
Fictional knights
Mythological swordfighters